Masontown is a borough in Fayette County, Pennsylvania, United States. It is part of the Pittsburgh Metro Area. The population of the borough was 3,274 at the 2020 census. It is served by the Albert Gallatin Area School District. Masontown is a small crossroads for the rural portions of western Fayette County, and it contains a small shopping center and a grocery store within its business district.

History
Fort Mason was built as a blockhouse from 1774 to 1778 by John Mason, also known as Johannes Phillip Maurer (1730-1812). Masontown became a town in 1798. He later moved to Ohio and is buried on a family farm in Columbiana County.

Geography
Masontown is located in southwestern Fayette County at  (39.846228, -79.903492).

Pennsylvania Route 21 passes through the northern and western part of the borough, leading east  to Uniontown, the Fayette county seat, and west across the Monongahela  to Waynesburg. Pennsylvania Route 166 passes through the center of Masontown as Main Street and leads south  to Point Marion at the confluence of the Monongahela and Cheat rivers.

Demographics

As of the census of 2000, there were 3,611 people, 1,536 households, and 984 families residing in the borough. The population density was 2,376.6 people per square mile (917.2/km2). There were 1,701 housing units at an average density of 1,119.5 per square mile (432.1/km2). The racial makeup of the borough was 93.27% White, 5.59% African American, 0.22% Native American, 0.03% Asian, 0.30% from other races, and 0.58% from two or more races. Hispanic or Latino of any race were 0.22% of the population.

There were 1,536 households, out of which 27.6% had children under the age of 18 living with them, 44.5% were married couples living together, 15.8% had a female householder with no husband present, and 35.9% were non-families. 33.1% of all households were made up of individuals, and 20.4% had someone living alone who was 65 years of age or older. The average household size was 2.32 and the average family size was 2.90.

In the borough the population was spread out, with 23.0% under the age of 18, 7.8% from 18 to 24, 23.2% from 25 to 44, 23.1% from 45 to 64, and 22.9% who were 65 years of age or older. The median age was 42 years. For every 100 females, there were 83.1 males. For every 100 females age 18 and over, there were 77.2 males.

The median income for a household in the borough was $24,049, and the median income for a family was $27,609. Males had a median income of $35,948 versus $18,194 for females. The per capita income for the borough was $13,875. About 19.7% of families and 25.2% of the population were below the poverty line, including 37.2% of those under age 18 and 16.6% of those age 65 or over.

Notable people
Frank L. Bowman, congressman from West Virginia
Mike Nixon, longtime Pittsburgh Steelers coach and scout

Gallery

References
     
 http://www.hmdb.org/marker.asp?marker=20334

External links
 Masontown borough official website

Populated places established in 1798
Pittsburgh metropolitan area
Boroughs in Fayette County, Pennsylvania
1798 establishments in Pennsylvania